Denée is a village of Wallonia and a district of the municipality of Anhée, located in the province of Namur, Belgium.

Maredsous Abbey and Maredret Abbey are located nearby.

External links
 

Sub-municipalities of Anhée
Former municipalities of Namur (province)